1995 Emmy Awards may refer to:

 47th Primetime Emmy Awards, the 1995 Emmy Awards ceremony honoring primetime programming during June 1994 – May 1995
 22nd Daytime Emmy Awards, the 1995 Emmy Awards ceremony honoring daytime programming during 1994
 23rd International Emmy Awards, honoring international programming

Emmy Award ceremonies by year